The Soy Sauce Brewing Museum is a museum in Douliu City, Yunlin County, Taiwan.

Transportation
The museum is accessible south east from Shiliu Station of Taiwan Railways.

See also
 List of museums in Taiwan

References

External links
 

Industry museums in Taiwan
Museums in Yunlin County
Soy products
Food museums in Taiwan
Soy sauces